Lyctocoris campestris is a species of true bug in the family Lyctocoridae. It is found in Europe and Northern Asia (excluding China), Central America, North America, Oceania, and Antarctica.

References

Further reading

External links
Lyctocoris campestris images at  Consortium for the Barcode of Life

Cimicomorpha
Lyctocoridae
Articles created by Qbugbot
Insects described in 1794